Bosnia and Herzegovina competed at the 2019 European Games in Minsk from 21 to 30 June 2019. Bosnia and Herzegovina were represented by 16 athletes in 6 sports.

Medalists

Competitors

Boxing

Cycling

Road

Canoe sprint

Judo

Men

Women

Shooting

Table tennis

References 

Nations at the 2019 European Games
European Games
2019